A fixative is a stabilizing or preservative agent:

 Dye fixatives or mordants, are chemical substances used in processing fabrics to create circumstances in the micro-substrates causing dye molecules to adhere and remain that way.
Fixative (drawing), a liquid usually sprayed over a finished piece of artwork to better preserve it and prevent smudging
Fixation (histology), a solution used to preserve or harden fresh tissue of cell specimens for microscopic examination
Fixative (perfumery), a substance used to reduce the evaporation rate and improve stability when added to more volatile components
Embalming chemicals, a variety of preservatives, sanitising and disinfectant agents, and additives used in modern embalming
Photographic fixer
Radioactivity fixatives, specialized polymer coatings used to contain or "fix" radionuclides to surfaces of equipment and buildings thereby preventing exposure to humans